Honnavalli Krishna  is an Indian actor in the Kannada film industry. His films include Ratha Sapthami (1986), Aasegobba Meesegobba (1990), Bhootayyana Maga Ayyu (1974), Janumada Jodi (1996).

Career
As of October 2017, Honnavalli Krishna has acted in one thousand films.

Selected filmography

 Sanaadi Appanna (1977)
 Olavu Geluvu (1977)
 Shankar Guru (1978)
 Vasantha Geetha (1980)
 Keralida Simha (1981)
 Anand (1986)
 Ratha Sapthami (1986)
 Dhruva Thare (1985)
 Manamecchida Hudugi (1987)
 Shiva Mecchida Kannappa (1988)
 Samyuktha (1988)
 Inspector Vikram (1989)
 Gajapathi Garvabhanga (1989)
 Neene Nanna Jeeva (1990)
 Aasegobba Meesegobba (1990)
 Aata Bombata (1990)
 Mruthyunjaya (1990)
 Modada Mareyalli (1991)
 Lockup Death (1994)
 Om (1995)
 Janumada Jodi (1996)
 Simhada Mari (1997)
 Ganga Yamuna (1997)
 Bhanda Alla Bahaddur (1997)
 Ranganna (1997)
 Swasthik (1998)
 Mari Kannu Hori Myage (1998)
 Veeranna (1998)
 Yaarige Saluthe Sambala (2000)
 Shabdavedhi (2000)
 Appu (2002 film) (2002)
 Veera Kannadiga (2003) 
 Ajju (2004)
 Durgi (2004)
 Aakash (film) (2005)
 Anatharu (2007)
 Aithalakkadi (2010)
 Jackie (2010)
 Anna Bond (2012)
 Drama (2012)
 Akka Pakka (2013)
 Neralu (2013)
 Ond Chance Kodi (2015)
 Arivu (2017)
 Raajakumara (2017)
 Haalu Thuppa (2017)
 Banna Bannada Baduku (2017)
 Dhairyam (2017)
 Bhootayyana Mommaga Ayyu (2018)
 Kismath (2018)
 Mayabazar 2016 (2020)
 Auto Ramanna (2021)
 hari kathe alla giri kathe (2022)

See also

List of people from Karnataka
Cinema of Karnataka
List of Indian film actors
Cinema of India

References

External links

Living people
Male actors in Kannada cinema
Indian male comedians
Indian male film actors
Male actors from Karnataka
20th-century Indian male actors
21st-century Indian male actors
1950 births